Daniel Robertson (died 1849) was a British architect.

Career
Robertson may have worked under Robert Adam in London, England; later he worked at Kew and Oxford. Robertson was an early exponent of the Norman Revival, designing both St Clement's Church, Oxford and St Swithun's parish church in Kennington, Berkshire (now in Oxfordshire) in this style as early as 1828.

Robertson then moved to Ireland, where he had considerable success and carried out commissions for notable country houses particularly in the southeastern part of the country. His work was in both the Neoclassical style and then in the Gothic Revival style of the 1830s with which he may be most associated.

Works
Robertson's buildings include:
Oriel College, Oxford: west range of St. Mary's Quad, 1826
Wadham College, Oxford: fireplace in hall, 1826
Oxford University Press, Oxford, 1826-30
St. Clement's parish church, Oxford, 1828
St. Swithun's parish church, Kennington, Berkshire (now Oxfordshire), 1828
Ballinkeele House (home of the Maher family)
Bloomfield Castle in County Wexford
Carrigglas Manor in County Longford (owned by Thomas Langlois Lefroy, Chief Justice of Ireland from 1852 to 1866))
Castleboro House (home of the Carew family)
Dunleckney Manor in County Carlow (seat of the Bagenal and Newton families)
Lisnavagh House, in County Carlow (seat of the McClintock Bunbury family, Baron Rathdonnell)
Johnstown Castle in Co. Wexford (home of the Grogan & Morgan families)
Wilton Castle in Co. Wexford (home of the Alcock family)
Wells House, Wells, Gorey Co. Wexford.

In addition to numerous major country house commissions, Robertson was also particularly noted as a landscape designer. His greatest accomplishments in that field were at Powerscourt and Killruddery, both of which capture long-distance views of the Great Sugar Loaf mountain in County Wicklow. Wells House also has plans of the gardens designed there by Daniel Robertson.

References

Sources and further reading

External links
Documentation of some of Robertson's work
 Architects who worked in Carlow

Year of birth missing
1849 deaths
Architects from London
English ecclesiastical architects